North Korea was one of the competing teams in 2018 Winter Paralympics in Pyeongchang, South Korea. The Games were the first for North Korea for the Winter Paralympics. The country has two skiers, Kim Jong-hyon(김정현) and Ma Yu-chol(마유철), racing in para-Nordic skiing.

Joint participation with South Korea 
The International Paralympic Committee said North Korea was going to participate in the Winter Games for the first time. North Korea will participate under a Korean Unification Flag like their delegation for the 2018 Winter Olympics did, in the Women's Ice Hockey tournament. However, North Korea athletes marched in the Paralympics opening ceremony under its own flag, unlike the Olympics opening ceremony where they marched under the Korean unification flag along with South Korean athletes.

North Korea had previously participated at the 2012 and 2016 Summer Paralympics.

Competitors 
The following is the list of number of competitors participating at the Games per sport.

Two athletes represented North Korea at the 2018 Winter Paralympics. They were Kim Jong-hyon and Ma Yu-chol and both competed in para-Nordic skiing.

Cross-country skiing 

The two athletes Kim Jong-hyon and Ma Yu-chol first competed internationally at the 2018 Paralympic Nordic Skiing World Cup, in Oberried, Germany in January 2018.  Kim was 59th in the world in January 2018 in the sitting cross country skiing men's race with 516.18 points. Ma was 58th in the world in January 2018 in the sitting cross country skiing men's race with 505.88 points.

References 

Nations at the 2018 Winter Paralympics
2018
Paralympics